Inna German (born 17 January 1983) is a Kazakhstani female volleyball player. 

She is a member of the Kazakhstan women's national volleyball team.
She was part of the Kazakhstani national team  at the 2014 FIVB Volleyball Women's World Championship in Italy. and at the 2016 Summer Olympics qualification.

On the club level, she played for Altay VC at the 2017 Asian Women's Club Volleyball Championship.

Clubs 

 2014  Karaganda
 2017—2018  Altay VC.

References

External links 
 FIVB profile
 rom right: Tereza Vanzurova and Nikol Sajdova of Czech republic and Inna German of Kazakhstan

1983 births
Living people
Kazakhstani women's volleyball players
People from Karaganda